Thomas Arundell (died 1433) was an English politician who was MP for Cornwall in 1417, 1419, 1429, and 1435 and High Sheriff of Cornwall 1422–1423, 1426–1427, 1432–1433 and Devon 1437–1438. He was the son of son of John Arundell (1366–1435), The Magnificent, of Lanherne, Cornwall. He was also a justice of the peace in the county.

References

1433 deaths
English MPs 1417
English MPs 1419
English MPs 1429
English MPs 1435
English justices of the peace
Thomas
Members of the Parliament of England (pre-1707) for Cornwall